Kaveh-ye Sofla (romanized as Kāveh-ye Soflá; also known as Kāveh) is a village in Kakavand-e Sharqi Rural District, Kakavand District, Delfan County, Lorestan Province, Iran. At the 2006 census, its population was 52, in 11 families.

References 

Towns and villages in Delfan County